Yaminan, also rendered as Yamanan or Yamnan, may refer to:
 Yaminan-e Olya
 Yaminan-e Sofla